Place: Pražský hrad, Prague

Date: 25.06.2008

the race was cut because of bad weather conditions (torrential rain)

Elite - Men

See also
Pražské schody - main page

References
 - official results

2008
2008 in cyclo-cross